Márton Homonnai (5 February 1906 – 15 October 1969), also known as Márton Hlavacsek, was a Hungarian water polo player who won two gold and one silver medals at the 1928, 1932 and the 1936 Summer Olympics; his team finished fifth in 1924. During his career Homonnai played 115 international matches, often alongside his brother Lajos. His daughter Katalin Szőke became an Olympic swimmer.

During World War II Homonnai was a policeman and a member of the Arrow Cross Party, which supported the Nazis. After the war, fearing prosecution (he was sentenced to death in absentia), he flew via Germany and Brazil to Argentina, where he died in 1969.

See also
 Hungary men's Olympic water polo team records and statistics
 List of Olympic champions in men's water polo
 List of Olympic medalists in water polo (men)
 List of players who have appeared in multiple men's Olympic water polo tournaments
 List of members of the International Swimming Hall of Fame

References

External links
 

1906 births
1969 deaths
Hungarian male water polo players
Water polo players at the 1924 Summer Olympics
Water polo players at the 1928 Summer Olympics
Water polo players at the 1932 Summer Olympics
Water polo players at the 1936 Summer Olympics
Olympic gold medalists for Hungary in water polo
Olympic silver medalists for Hungary in water polo
Medalists at the 1936 Summer Olympics
Medalists at the 1932 Summer Olympics
Medalists at the 1928 Summer Olympics
Water polo players from Budapest
20th-century Hungarian people